Lokumarakkalage Dilshan Madushanka (born 18 September 2000) is a professional Sri Lankan cricketer who currently plays Twenty20 Internationals for Sri Lanka. He is a past pupil of Hungama Vijayaba Central College,Hungama.

Domestic career
He made his first-class debut on 13 March 2020, for Colts Cricket Club in the 2019–20 Premier League Tournament. In October 2020, he was drafted by the Dambulla Viiking for the inaugural edition of the Lanka Premier League. He made his Twenty20 debut on 9 December 2020, for the Dambulla Viiking in the 2020 Lanka Premier League.

In August 2021, he was named in the SLC Blues team for the 2021 SLC Invitational T20 League tournament. In November 2021, he was selected to play for the Galle Gladiators following the players' draft for the 2021 Lanka Premier League. In July 2022, he was signed by the Jaffna Kings for the third edition of the Lanka Premier League.

International career
In January 2020, he was named in Sri Lanka's squad for the 2020 Under-19 Cricket World Cup. On 27 January 2020, in Sri Lanka's plate quarter-final match against Nigeria, Madushanka took a five-wicket haul.

In December 2020, Madushanka was named in Sri Lanka's Test squad for their series against South Africa. In February 2021, Madushanka was named in Sri Lanka's limited overs squad for their series against the West Indies. In April 2021, Madushanka was again named in Sri Lanka's Test squad, this time for their series against Bangladesh.

In April 2022, he was named in Sri Lanka's Test squad for their series against Bangladesh. He made his List A debut on 8 June 2022, for Sri Lanka A against Australia A during Australia's tour of Sri Lanka. Later the same month, he was named in Sri Lanka's Test squad, also for their home series against Australia.

Also in July, he was again named in Sri Lanka's Test squad, this time for their home series against Pakistan. In August 2022, he was named in Sri Lanka's Twenty20 International (T20I) squad for the 2022 Asia Cup. He made his T20I debut on 27 August 2022, against Afghanistan. Madushanka made a promising start to his international career, especially in the match against India, where he dismantled Indian top order by swinging the ball into the right-hand batters, and flattened the stumps twice including knocking two of Virat Kohli's out of the ground and then Deepak Hooda.

Madushanka made his One Day International debut on 10 January 2023, against India.Madushanka took his maiden  ODI wicket of Rohit Sharma.

References
left arm fast

External links
 

2000 births
Living people
Sri Lankan cricketers
Sri Lanka Twenty20 International cricketers
Colts Cricket Club cricketers
Dambulla Aura cricketers
Place of birth missing (living people)